Ruspoli's turaco (Menelikornis ruspolii), also known as Prince Ruspoli's turaco, is a species of bird in the family Musophagidae.  It is endemic to southern Ethiopia where its natural habitat is subtropical or tropical dry forests.  It is threatened by habitat loss.

Taxonomy

The species was first collected by Eugenio Ruspoli in either 1892 or 1893, but due to his subsequent death, the location and date of this find remain unknown. However, his collection was examined by T. Salvadori, who named the bird in his honor.

References

External links
BirdLife Species Factsheet.

Ruspoli's turaco
Endemic birds of Ethiopia
Ruspoli's turaco
Taxonomy articles created by Polbot
Taxobox binomials not recognized by IUCN